At least two warships of Japan have borne the name Ōyodo:

 , was an  launched in 1942 and sunk in 1945
 , is an  launched in 1989

Japanese Navy ship names